The N23 road is a national primary road in Ireland, and is located entirely in County Kerry. The route is one of the shorter national primary routes, merely forming a link road between the N21 Limerick – Tralee route at Castleisland to the N22 Tralee – Killarney – Cork route at Farranfore. This facilitates traffic passing in the Limerick – Killarney direction or vice versa, allowing it to avoid detouring into Tralee.

See also
Roads in Ireland 
Motorways in Ireland
National secondary road
Regional road

References
Roads Act 1993 (Classification of National Roads) Order 2006 – Department of Transport

23
Roads in County Kerry